Domingo José Larrainzar Santamaría (Txomin Larrainzar in Basque; born 8 September 1969) is a Spanish former footballer who played mainly as a central defender.

His younger brother Iñigo, often referred to as Larrainzar II, was also a footballer, and both played at Osasuna.

Club career
Larrainzar was born in Pamplona. A product of hometown CA Osasuna's youth ranks, he amassed seven La Liga appearances from 1988 to 1990. In his third season he helped with 14 games and one goal to help the Navarrese club finish fourth and qualify for the UEFA Cup– although younger, his brother Iñigo was already an essential member of the squad.

With Osasuna in the second division, Larrainzar dropped down to the third level and moved to Málaga CF, helping the side return to the top flight in just two years. Although never an undisputed starter, he featured regularly.

In 2002–03, prior to Málaga's Intertoto Cup conquest, Larrainzar returned to the second tier with Levante UD, but retired at the end of the campaign at the age of 33.

Honours
Spain U16
UEFA European Under-16 Championship: 1986

References

External links

Stats at Amigos Malaguistas 

1969 births
Living people
Footballers from Pamplona
Spanish footballers
Association football defenders
La Liga players
Segunda División players
Segunda División B players
CA Osasuna B players
CA Osasuna players
Málaga CF players
Levante UD footballers
Spain youth international footballers
Spain under-21 international footballers
Spain under-23 international footballers